Václav Hudeček (born June 7, 1952 in Rožmitál pod Třemšínem, Czechoslovakia) is a Czech violinist. A former student of David Oistrakh, Hudeček's records have sold many copies in the Czech Republic, especially a 1992 recording of Vivaldi's The Four Seasons, certified platinum. Hudeček also runs an annual academy for promising young Czech violinists.

Biography
Hudeček studied at the Prague Conservatory. On 11 November 1967, aged 15, he performed with the Royal Philharmonic Orchestra in London. The next day he was heard by the Russian violinist David Oistrakh, and became his pupil from 1970 to Oistrakh's death in 1974.

Since his London debut he has appeared in concert at venues including Carnegie Hall, the Royal Festival Hall, Suntory Hall, and Osaka Festival Hall. He has played with orchestras including the Berliner Philharmoniker, Cleveland Symphony Orchestra, and NHK Symphony Orchestra, as well as appearing at festivals including Osaka, Salzburg, Istanbul, Perth, and Helsinki). He has released records on the Supraphon label.

Hudeček's 1992 recording of Antonio Vivaldi's The Four Seasons with the conductor Pavel Kogan is the most successful classical recording ever in the Czech Republic, and has been certified gold and in 1997 platinum. Hudeček has also received golden records for other recordings.

As well as compositions by David Oistrakh, Hudeček performs works by 20th century composers including Leoš Janáček and Sergei Prokofiev, and contemporary Czech composers such as Kymlička, Fišer, and Mácha.

Hudeček has also worked as a teacher in Canada, Japan, and Germany. Since 1997 he has been organising the Václav Hudeček Academy, a 10-day course for young violinists held every August in Luhačovice. The best participants from this course are awarded a new violin and a contract to appear with Hudeček at his concerts. Violinists awarded from his academy include Josef Špaček, Marek Pavelec, and Jiří Vodička.

In 2007, Hudeček received the "National Award for Achievement in the Area of Culture and the Arts" from Czech President Václav Klaus.
 
Hudeček is married to actress Eva Hudečková.

References

External links
Czech Radio
Václav Hudeček Academy website

1952 births
Living people
People from Rožmitál pod Třemšínem
Czech classical violinists
Male classical violinists
Recipients of Medal of Merit (Czech Republic)
21st-century classical violinists
21st-century Czech male musicians